All Malaysia Malayalee Association or abbreviated as AMMA is an umbrella body for the various Malaysian Malayali associations/samajams throughout Malaysia. The principal aim is to foster closer co-operation with all Malayali organisations in Malaysia and also with all the other Indian organisations for the betterment of the Indian community in Malaysia. The organisation was formed on  30 August 1972. From the beginning, it remain the co-ordinating body of the Malayali Associations of Malaysia, and continues to emphasise its commitment to education, welfare, culture and economic well being of the Malaysian Malayali community. The organisation does not have individual membership, but has a membership of fifteen Affiliate Malayali organisations across Malaysia including itself.

Affiliates
The affiliates of the organisation are as follows:

Awards
Garshom Best Malayalee Association Award 2011  - Garshom International Award 2011

See also
 Malaysian Malayali
 World Malayalee Council

References

Malayali organizations
Ethnic organisations based in Malaysia
1972 establishments in Malaysia
Kerala diaspora
Garshom Awardees